The Bass and I is an album by the bassist Ron Carter, recorded in 1997 and originally released on the Japanese Somethin' Else label with a US release on Blue Note Records.

Reception

The AllMusic review by Scott Yanow observed: "As is usual on Carter's records, he is the main soloist on many of the songs though Scott also has plenty of good spots". In JazzTimes, Fred Bouchard stated: "Forget the name, the title, the aura of legend. This is a decent little trio album by a primo rhythm section, with extra added percussion, without bass-clef sturm und drang. ... The set is slowed only by his limp compositions and lack of charts. Three standards and a jazz classic go well enough, and so does an original blues. But two nine-minute slow-loping sambas back to back, with an excess of vamping, hogtie the date".

Track listing 
All compositions by Ron Carter except where noted
 "You and the Night and the Music" (Arthur Schwartz, Howard Dietz) – 5:36	
 "Someday My Prince Will Come" (Frank Churchill, Larry Morey) – 7:25
 "Blues for D.P." – 6:19
 "The Shadow of Your Smile" (Johnny Mandel, Paul Francis Webster) – 7:10
 "Mr. Bow-Tie" – 9:12
 "Double Bass" – 8:17
 "I Remember Clifford" (Benny Golson) – 10:23

Personnel 
Ron Carter - bass 
Stephen Scott – piano
Lewis Nash – drums
Steve Kroon – percussion

References 

Ron Carter albums
1997 albums
Blue Note Records albums
Albums recorded at Van Gelder Studio